The Cabarrus Arena & Events Center is located in Concord, North Carolina, about 24 miles northeast of Charlotte.

The complex consists of the arena, two event centers, two reception halls, and rooms for business meetings.

The venue is home to many concerts, trade and consumer shows, local, regional and national sporting events, AKC sanctioned dog shows. It is a favorite of regional and national cheer and dance competitions and serves as the location for commencement ceremonies for all Cabarrus County Schools high schools, three Union County high schools and for the Cabarrus County branch of Rowan-Cabarrus Community College. It was previously home to the Carolina Thunder of the American Basketball Association, the Carolina Speed of the American Indoor Football Association, and the Carolina Force of American Indoor Football.

The Cabarrus Arena hosted Total Nonstop Action Wrestling's biggest event Bound for Glory on October 4, 2015. and other Premiere Wrestling Xperience and Evolve Wrestling shows. The Cabarrus Arena also hosted Ring of Honor Wrestling's Best in the World '16, Honor Reigns Supreme 2018 and 2019, Queen City Excellence, and Crockett Cup (2019).

References

External links
Cabarrus Arena & Events Center

Concord, North Carolina
Sports venues in Cabarrus County, North Carolina
Indoor arenas in North Carolina
Basketball venues in North Carolina
2002 establishments in North Carolina
Sports venues completed in 2002